The Luiz Gonzaga Dam, formerly known as the Itaparica Dam, is a rock-fill embankment dam on the São Francisco River  downstream of Petrolândia in Pernambuco, Brazil. The dam was built for navigation, and hydroelectric power generation as it supports a  power station. It was constructed between 1979 and 1988; the last of its generators was commissioned in 1990.

The dam is owned and operated by CHESF and was renamed in honor of Luiz Gonzaga, known as the "king of Baião" and "Gonzagão"

Dam
The contains a  concrete section that supports the power plants and spillway of which contains nine floodgates.

Power plant
The station contains six SíncronoVertical Francis turbines within generators that have an installed capacity of  each, totaling 1,479 MW. The first generator was commissioned on June 13, 1988, another later that year, three more were commissioned in 1989 and the final generator went online on February 13, 1990. Three of the generators were manufactured by Gie and the other three along with three of the turbines by Siemens. Voith manufactured the three remaining turbines.

Involuntary relocation controversy
Before construction on the dam began in July 1979, the involuntary relocation of 40,000 people - 10,000 from urban and 30,000 from rural areas, mostly indigenous Tuxá - from the future reservoir area began. Those being relocated protested the dam and formed Polosindical because of farmland loss, subsequent unemployment and hunger along with previous relocation difficulties associated with the upstream Sobradinho Dam in the 1970s. In 1986, CHESF, the builders of the dam, agreed to construct irrigation facilities. The World Bank had described CHESF's relocation plan as flawed and financed a $500 million resettlement program if certain criteria were met. The World Bank estimates that each family will cost $60,000 and the construction of irrigation facilities is slowly progressing.

See also

 List of power stations in Brazil

References

Dams in Pernambuco
Rock-filled dams
Dams completed in 1988
Dams on the São Francisco River